Hypoptopoma baileyi is a species of catfish of the family Loricariidae.

This catfish reaches a maximum length of  SL. It is demersal, being found in fresh water in the tropics.
 
Hypoptopoma baileyi is native to South America, Río Iténez, in the upper Rio Madeira basin, along the border between Bolivia and Brazil.

The fish is named in honor of ichthyologist Reeve M. Bailey (1911-2011) of the University of Michigan, who helped collect the type specimen in 1964.

Interactions with humans

Hypoptopoma baileyi is harmless to humans.

References

Aquino, A.E. and S.A. Schaefer, 2010. Systematics of the genus Hypoptopoma Günther, 1868 (Siluriformes, Loricariidae). Bull. Amer. Mus. Nat. Hist. 336:1-110. 

Hypoptopomatini
Catfish of South America
Fish of Bolivia
Fish of Brazil
Taxa named by Adriana Elbia Aquino
Taxa named by Scott Allen Schaefer
Fish described in 2010